Borislav Simić (Serbian Cyrillic: Борислав Симић; born 15 May 1987) is a Serbian football defender.

External links
 

1987 births
Living people
Footballers from Belgrade
Serbian footballers
FK Teleoptik players
FK Smederevo players
SK Dynamo České Budějovice players
Serbian SuperLiga players
Serbian expatriate footballers
Expatriate footballers in the Czech Republic
NK Inter Zaprešić players
Association football defenders